Adam and Eve is a 1953 Danish comedy written and directed by Erik Balling. The film was awarded the 1954 Bodil Award for Best Danish Film and Per Buckhøj won the Bodil Award for Best Actor for his role as the zealous schoolteacher.

Plot
On the way home from a conference in Paris, Mr. Johansen accidentally finds himself in possession of an insignificant little French book. He has no idea where the book came from or what it concerns, but he decides he should secretly smuggle it through customs. Thereafter, the book passes through the hands of 5 different people, and causes unexpected conflicts, suspicions and misunderstandings for each of them.

Cast
 Louis Miehe-Renard – Adam
  Sonja Jensen – Eva
 Per Buckhøj – Sven Aage Johansen
 Inger Lassen – Adam's mother
 Gunnar Lauring – Claus' father
 Beatrice Bonnesen – Claus' mother
 Bertel Lauring – Claus
 Einar Juhl – Adam's Teacher
 Birgitte Reimer – Peter's secretary
 Poul Reichhardt – Peter
 Astrid Villaume – Peter's wife
 Asbjørn Andersen – Carl Henriksen
 Karin Nellemose – Carl's wife
 Bjørn Watt Boolsen – Larsen
 Preben Lerdorff Rye – Burglar
 Lis Løwert – Prostitute
 Poul Müller – Antique dealer
 Birgitte Federspiel – Antique dealer's wife
 Emil Hass Christensen – Reverend
 Henning Moritzen – Customs agent
 John Wittig – Aagaard
 Bendt Rothe – Defender
 Karl Stegger – Man on the street
 Ellen Margrethe Stein – Judge Lauersen
 Ebbe Langberg – Classmate
 Jørgen Buckhøj – Classmate
 Otto Detlefsen – Judge

References

External links
 
 Adam og Eva at the Danish Film Database (in Danish)
 Adam og Eva at Det Danske Filminstitut (in Danish)

1953 films
1953 comedy-drama films
1950s Danish-language films
Films directed by Erik Balling
Films with screenplays by Erik Balling
Danish comedy-drama films
Danish black-and-white films
Best Danish Film Bodil Award winners